Toni Montano (Serbian Cyrillic: Тони Монтано), real name Velibor Miljković (Serbian Cyrillic: Велибор Миљковић) is a Serbian rock musician.

Biography

Radost Evrope
Miljković started his career as a vocalist of the band punk rock Radost Evrope (trans. Joy of Europe), formed in 1979. The band lineup consisted of a large number of members, including Dime "Mune" Todorovski, later the member of Partibrejkers and Slobodan "Loka" Nešović, later the member of Urbana Gerila/Berliner Strasse and Defektno Efektni. They had rehearsals and performed at the Belgrade SKC, mainly cover versions of the Ramones songs, but also had their own material. The band did not leave any recordings, and performed until 1985, when they disbanded. However, part of the material performed by Radost Evrope appeared on Miljković's debut album. One of the last live appearances the band had as an opening act for the Angelic Upstarts, in April 1985. After the band disbanded, Miljković pursued a solo career.

Solo career
After the disbandment of Radost Evrope, Miljković named himself after the Scarface lead character Tony Montana. He released his debut album Tonny Montano in 1986. The album was produced by Buldožer member Borut Činč (who also played keyboards on the album) and combined punk rock and rockabilly, a combination Montano described as frkabili (rushabilly). The album featured songs "Vreme je da skinem mrak" ("It's Time that I Score for the First Time"), "Frigidna" ("Frigid", a cover of Sex Pistols song "Friggin' in the Riggin") and "Boli me zub" ("My Tooth Aches") previously performed with Radost Evrope. It also featured a cover versions of Dragan Stojnić's "Balada o Boni i Klajd" ("The Ballad of Bonnie and Clyde") and Bobby Freeman's "Do You Wanna Dance?". At the beginning, Montano's support band consisted of musicians who also chose pseudonyms after famous gangsters: Edi Salvatore (a former member of Radost Evrope, guitar), Manzanera (a former member of Partibrejkers, drums), Pjetro Manolo (bass guitarist), Serđo Manini (guitar), all of them at the same time members of the band Rock Street.

Toni Montano's next record Talični Tom je mrtav (Lucky Luke Is Dead), released in 1987, featured similar sound, and in 1988 he released the live album Live - mi smo iz Beograda (Mutant party) (Live - We're from Belgrade (Mutant Party)), which was not well received. At the time, Toni Montano and the band Đavoli from Split organized corporate Yugoslav tour. The album Lovac na novac (Money Hunter) was released in 1991 and featured a cover of Đorđe Marjanović's "Zvižduk u osam" ("Whistle at Eight O'Clock"), football chant "Mi smo šampioni" ("We Are the Champions") and song "Odlaziš 1984 - 1990" ("You Are Leaving 1984 - 1990") dedicated to the members of Prljavo Kazalište. Album featured members of Vampiri on backing vocals.

In 1993, Toni Montano acted in a stageplay Bilo jednom u Beogradu (Once Upon a Time in Belgrade) directed by himself and Miki Manojlović. Anent the stage play Toni Montano released the album of the same title. The song "Godfather" featured members of Orthodox Celts as guests. The album Najbolje od najboljeg 1991 - 1995 (Best of the Best 1991 - 1995) was released in 1995. The song "Mi smo srećna porodica" ("We're A Happy Family") featured Nele Karajlić on vocals. The album Moja žena fudbal ne voli! (Zašto?)" (My Wife Doesn't Like Football! (Why?)) featured rerecorded "Mi smo šampioni" and "Mi smo iz Beograda" and football chant "Obilić" recorded for FK Obilić. Compilation album Hajde, slušaj ovaj CD (Come on, Listen to This CD), released in 1999, featured a cover of Elvis J. Kurtović's song "Da bog da crk'o rock 'n' roll" ("I Hope Rock 'n' Roll Dies"). At the same time studio album Srećan rođendan (Happy Birthday) was released. The album featured members of Radijacija and Mega Bend, guitarist Nenad ″Nele″ Stamatović (former Bulevar member) and singer Sonja Mitrović "Hani". Srećan rođendan featured a cover version of Prljavo Kazalište song "Široke ulice" ("Wide Streets"). After the 2000 political changes in Serbia, Montano semi-retired from the scene.

In 2006, Montano released a compilation album Blue Eyes - Best of Tonny Montano, and, in 2007, the other called Lepšoj od najlepše (To the Prettiest of Them All), both released through City Records.

In 2012, Montano released the compilation album Istinita ljubavna priča - Jubilej - 25 godina muzičkog rada (True Love Story - Jubilee - 25 Years of Musical Work) through PGP-RTS. Following the release of the compilation album, Montano gathered a group of Belgrade-based musicians to form a touring band for a live performances comeback. The lineup features Eddie Salvatore (rhythm guitar), Santos Traficante (lead guitar), Vincenzo de Mora (bass guitar) and Emilio Horhas (drums). Montano and the band had their first performance on Belgrade Beer Fest on August 14, 2012.

Movie appearances
Toni Montano appeared in the movies Strangler vs. Strangler and Brod plovi za Šangaj.

Controversy
Toni Montano often stirred controversy in his interviews and frequently attacked other musicians, like Ekatarina Velika, whom he considered pseudointellectuals who alienated themselves from the "street", where, according to him, the real rock music should emerge from. He arrogantly proclaimed himself a "real rock star" whose time is yet to come. However he never really managed to achieve the success of his adversaries.

At the end of 1990s Montano became related to the Socialist Party of Serbia and its former regime and organized most of his live appearances in order to promote the party.

Legacy
In 2000, Serbian singer Viktorija covered Montano′s song "Svi se sada njišu" ("Now Everyone Is Swinging"), on her live cover album Nostalgija (Nostalgia).

Discography

Studio albums
Tonny Montano (1986)
Talični Tom je mrtav (1987)
Lovac na novac (1991)
Bilo jednom u Beogradu (1994)
Moja žena fudbal ne voli! (Zašto?) (1997)
Srećan rođendan (1999)

Live albums
Mutant Party Live! (Mi smo iz Beograda) (1988)

Compilations
Najbolje od najboljeg 1986 - 1991 (1995)
Najbolje od najboljeg 1991 - 1995 (1995)
Hajde, slušaj ovaj CD (1999)
Blue Eyes - Best of Tonny Montano (2006)
Lepšoj od najlepše! (2007)
Istinita ljubavna priča - Jubilej: 25 godina muzičkog rada 1986-2011 (2012)
Neću da budem šljam - Jubilej: 37 godina muzičkog rada (2019)

Singles
Perač prozora/Frigidna (1986)
Talični Tom je mrtav/Banane (1987) 
Da bog da crk'o rock 'n' roll (1998)

References

EX YU ROCK enciklopedija 1960-2006, Janjatović Petar;

External links
Toni Montano at Discogs
Toni Montano at YouTube
Toni Montano at Last.fm

1962 births
Living people
Musicians from Belgrade
Serbian rock singers
Serbian punk rock musicians
Yugoslav rock singers
Yugoslav musicians